Waking the Dead is the eighth L.A. Guns album. Released in 2002, it would be the last album featuring band founder Tracii Guns, until he reunited with the band in 2017. It is also the first with bass guitarist Adam Hamilton.

The album includes "OK, Let's Roll" - dedicated to Todd Beamer and those who rushed the cockpit of Flight 93 during the events of September 11, 2001 attacks.

Though slated to be included, the Japanese edition was never officially released, leaving "Call of the Wild" unavailable.

Track listing
"Don't Look at Me That Way" – 4:00
"OK, Let's Roll" – 3:54
"Waking the Dead" – 3:23
"Revolution" – 3:26
"The Ballad" – 5:21
"Frequency" – 4:38
"Psychopathic Eyes" – 3:04
"Hellraisers Ball" – 3:23
"City of Angels" – 3:39
"Don't You Cry" – 4:22
"Call of the Wild" – 3:51 (Japanese unreleased bonus track)

Personnel
Phil Lewis – vocals
Tracii Guns – guitar
Adam Hamilton – bass guitar
Steve Riley – drums

Additional personnel
 Ricky Beck Mahler - additional guitar on "The Ballad" and "Call of the Wild"

Production
Producer – Andy Johns
Engineer – Bruce Witkin
Mastering – Dave Schultz
Crew – Brad Nelson
Photography – Glen LaFerman
Cover design – Maxine Miller
Design, layout design – Vinny Cimino

References

L.A. Guns albums
2002 albums
Albums produced by Andy Johns